Louis Bowen Lawton (March 13, 1872 – July 9, 1949) was a United States Army officer during the Boxer Rebellion who earned the Medal of Honor for his actions at Tientsin, China on July 13, 1900.  An 1893 graduate of West Point, Lawton was a 1st Lieutenant at Tientsin.  He was awarded the Medal of Honor on March 11, 1902. He is buried in Auburn, New York.

Medal of Honor citation
Carried a message and guided reinforcements across a wide, fireswept space despite being wounded three times.

See also

List of Medal of Honor recipients for the Boxer Rebellion

References

1872 births
1949 deaths
United States Army Medal of Honor recipients
American military personnel of the Boxer Rebellion
United States Military Academy alumni
United States Army officers
People from Independence, Iowa
Boxer Rebellion recipients of the Medal of Honor
Military personnel from Iowa